Swaziland competed at the 2018 Commonwealth Games in the Gold Coast, Australia from April 4 to April 15, 2018.

Competitors
The following is the list of number of competitors participating at the Games per sport/discipline.

Athletics (track and field)

Men
Track & road events

Women
Track & road events

Field events

Boxing

Swaziland participated with a team of 2 athletes (2 men).

Men

Cycling

Swaziland participated with 3 athletes (3 men).

Road
Men

References

Nations at the 2018 Commonwealth Games
Eswatini at the Commonwealth Games
Com